Antoni is a Catalan, Polish, and Slovene given name and a surname used in the eastern part of Spain, Poland and Slovenia. As a Catalan given name it is a variant of the male names Anton and Antonio. As a Polish given name it is a variant of the female names Antonia and Antonina. As a Slovene name it is a variant of the male names Anton, Antonij and Antonijo and the female name Antonija. As a surname it is derived from the Antonius root name. It may refer to:

Given name 
 Antoni Brzeżańczyk, Polish football player and manager
 Antoni Derezinski, Northern Irish Strongman
 Antoni Gaudi, Catalan architect
 Antoni Kenar, Polish sculptor
 Antoni Lima, Catalan footballer
 Antoni Lomnicki, Polish mathematician
 Antoni Melchior Fijałkowski, Polish bishop
 Antoni Niemczak, Polish long-distance runner
 Józef Antoni Poniatowski, Polish prince and Marshal of France
 Antoni Porowski, Polish-Canadian chef, actor, and television personality
 Antoni Radziwiłł, Polish politician
 Antoni Słonimski, Polish poet and writer

Surname 
 Brian Antoni (born 1958), American author
 Dmitri Antoni (born 1983), Estonian figure skater
 Janine Antoni (born 1964), Bahamian artist
 Jennipher Antoni (born 1976), German actress
 Lorenc Antoni (1909 – 1991), Kosovo Albanian composer
 Mark De Gli Antoni (born 1962), American composer 
 Robert Antoni (born 1958), West Indian writer
 Robert "Stewkey" Antoni (born 1947), American musician
 Valdete Antoni (born 1953), Albanian poet
 Voldemar Antoni (1886 – 1974), Ukrainian anarchist

See also

Anthoni, name
Anthony (disambiguation)
Antonic
Antonik
Antonin (name)
Antoniu
Antono (name)
Antony (disambiguation)
Anttoni Honka

Notes

Catalan masculine given names
Polish masculine given names
Slovene masculine given names
Masculine given names